The men's 58 kg competition in Taekwondo at the 2020 Summer Olympics was held on 24 July 2021 at the Makuhari Messe Hall A.

Results

Main bracket

Repechage

References

External links
Draw 

Men's 58 kg
Men's events at the 2020 Summer Olympics